The Alternative Ecologists, officially the Federation of Ecologists and Alternative Groups, was a federation of several groups created after the good performance of an autonomous electoral platform also called Alternative Ecologists in the 1989 European Parliament elections in Greece. It contested the national elections of November 1989 and 1990, taking one seat in each election.

The groups involved in the federation decided to dissolve it in 1993.

Subsequently, some other individuals attempted to use the same title and took legal action for this purpose. One of these groups now forms part of the Front of the Greek Anticapitalist Left.

This first attempt to found a Greek Green party was followed by the Green list entitled Political Ecology, which participated in the 1994 European Parliament election, and the creation of Green Politics (Prasini Politiki) in 1996. Both of these organisations failed to make any significant impact.

Party's electoral results

External links
Alternative Ecologists

1989 establishments in Greece
1993 disestablishments in Greece
Defunct socialist parties in Greece
Ecosocialist parties
Green political parties in Greece
Political parties disestablished in 1993
Political parties established in 1989